Imam Seedy Jagne (born 1 October 2003) is a Swedish professional footballer who plays as a midfielder for Mjällby.

Born in The Gambia, he has represented Sweden at youth international level.

Club career
Jagne started playing football for Gothenburg based side Solväders FC before joining Häcken at the age of 12.
Jagne made his professional debut for Häcken on 2 November 2019, coming on as a substitute in stoppage time during 4–1 loss to Hammarby.

On 4 October 2020, he joined Premier League club Everton on a three-year deal. However, he left the club a year early in the summer of 2022.

He returned to train with his former club Häcken before joining Mjällby  in January 2023 on a three-year deal.

International career
Jagne has represented Sweden at under-17 level. In September 2021, he made his debut for Sweden U19, playing in a friendly against Finland U19.

Personal life
Born in The Gambia, Jagne moved to Sweden at the age of 6.

References

External links

Living people
2003 births
Swedish footballers
Association football midfielders
Sweden youth international footballers
Allsvenskan players
BK Häcken players
Everton F.C. players
Expatriate footballers in England
Swedish expatriate footballers
Swedish expatriate sportspeople in England
Gambian emigrants to Sweden
Mjällby AIF players